Vinod Chopra Films is an Indian film production company owned and operated by Hindi film-maker Vidhu Vinod Chopra. It was founded by Chopra in 1985. It has made many major Bollywood films since then.

Film Production

Highest-grossing films (under Chopra's vice-chairmanship)

References

Film production companies based in Mumbai
1985 establishments in Maharashtra
Indian companies established in 1985
Mass media companies established in 1985